Balacra preussi is a moth of the family Erebidae. It was described by Per Olof Christopher Aurivillius in 1904 and is found in Cameroon, the Democratic Republic of the Congo, Equatorial Guinea, Ivory Coast, Kenya, Nigeria and Tanzania.

References

Balacra
Moths described in 1904
Erebid moths of Africa